Laura Georgeta Ilie, also known as Coman (born 30 April 1993) is a Romanian sport shooter. She won the gold medal in the women's rifle event at both the 2019 European 10 m Events Championships in Osijek, Croatia and 2020 European 10 m Events Championships in Wrocław, Poland.

In 2019, she won the gold medal in the women's 10 metre air rifle event at the 2019 European Games held in Minsk, Belarus.

She represented Romania at the 2020 Summer Olympics in Tokyo, Japan.

References

External links
 

Living people
1993 births
Sportspeople from Bucharest
Romanian female sport shooters
Shooters at the 2019 European Games
European Games gold medalists for Romania
European Games medalists in shooting
Olympic shooters of Romania
Shooters at the 2020 Summer Olympics
Universiade medalists in shooting
Medalists at the 2015 Summer Universiade
Universiade gold medalists for Romania
21st-century Romanian women